Saint-François-de-Sales is a municipality in Quebec, Canada.

Demographics
Population trend:
 Population in 2011: 654 (2006 to 2011 population change: -10.5%)
 Population in 2006: 731
 Population in 2001: 735
 Population in 1996: 717
 Population in 1991: 832

Private dwellings occupied by usual residents: 288 (total dwellings: 411)

Mother tongue:
 English as first language: 0%
 French as first language: 95.1%
 English and French as first language: 0%
 Other as first language: 4.9%

References

External links

Municipalities in Quebec
Incorporated places in Saguenay–Lac-Saint-Jean
Canada geography articles needing translation from French Wikipedia